Nimatullah, also spelled Ni'matullāh, Nematollah etc. is an Arabic male given name.

Etymology
Unlike Persian "Nima", whether used as masculine and usually feminine name, may have been possibly adopted from the neighbouring Arabic noun-adjective "نِعْمَة - ni‘mah / ni‘amah" - basic meaning: "blessing" or other meanings: "abundance; benefaction; beneficence; blessing; boon; favor; grace; kindness", for example, a lesser-composite Muslim masculine name like "نِعْمَةُ ٱلله - Ni‘mat’Ullah / Ni‘amat’Ullah - Blessing of Allah (God)" or a secondary meaning in the following sentence explained. However, this "نِعْمَة - ni‘mah / ni‘amah" denoted and referenced in the Quran is meant as "the Favour(s)/ Grace of Allah (God)".

People
Shah Nimatullah Wali (1330–1431), Islamic scholar and Sufi poet
Ignatius Ni'matallah (–1587), Syriac Orthodox Patriarch of Antioch
Nimat Allah al-Harawi (fl. 1613–1630), Mughal scholar
Nematollah Jazayeri (1640–1700), Islamic scholar
Naimatullah Khan (1930–2020), Pakistani politician and Mayor of Karachi
Nimatullah Kassab (–1858), Lebanese Maronite Catholic saint
Hajj Nematollah (1871–1919), Iranian scholar
Nematollah Nassiri (1911–1979), Iranian politician and diplomat
Nematollah Salehi Najafabadi (1923/24–2006), Iranian cleric
Nematollah Gorji (1926–2000), Iranian actor
Nematollah Aghasi (1939–2005), Iranian singer
, Iranian Politician 
Nematullah Shahrani (born 1941), Afghan scholar and politician
Nemat (militant), Uzbek-Afghan Militant
Nigmatilla Yuldashev (born 1962), Uzbek politician
Nematullo Quttiboev (born 1973), Uzbek footballer

Places
Shah Nematollah Vali Shrine, Iran
Ni'matullāhī, Iranian Sufi order
Nigmatullino, Russia

See also
 List of Arabic theophoric names

Arabic masculine given names